Fifield may refer to:

People
Adele Fifield (born 1966), Canadian director of the War Amps' National Amputee Centre
Arthur Fifield, founder of English publishing house A. C. Fifield, taken over in 1922 by Jonathan Cape
Benjamin F. Fifield (1832–1918), Vermont attorney
Cec Fifield (1903–1957), Australian rugby footballer and coach
Christopher Fifield, English conductor, historian and critic
Darren Fifield, English boxer of the 1990s
Edwin G. Fifield (1862–1925), Wisconsin politician
Elaine Fifield (1930–1999), Australian ballerina
James W. Fifield Jr. (1899–1977), American Congregational minister and co-founder of  Spiritual Mobilization
Jim Fifield, American president/CEO of EMI
Mitch Fifield (born 1967), Australian politician
Sam Fifield (1839–1915), Wisconsin politician

Places

Australia
Fifield, New South Wales

England
Fifield, Berkshire
Fifield, Oxfordshire
Fifield, Wiltshire
Fifield Bavant, Wiltshire

United States
Fifield, Wisconsin, a town
Fifield (community), Wisconsin, an unincorporated community

See also 
 
 Fyfield (disambiguation)